Beauharnois  is a city located in the Beauharnois-Salaberry Regional County Municipality of southwestern Quebec, Canada, and is part of the Greater Montreal Area. The city's population as of the Canada 2011 Census was 12,011. It is home to the Beauharnois Hydroelectric Power Station, as well as the Beauharnois Lock of the Saint Lawrence Seaway.

History

The Battle of Beauharnois was fought at Beauharnois in 1838, between Lower Canada loyalists and Patriote rebels.

As part of the 2000–2006 municipal reorganization in Quebec, the neighbouring towns of Maple Grove and Melocheville were amalgamated into Beauharnois on January 1, 2002.

Geography

Communities
The following locations reside within the municipality's boundaries:
Domaine-de-la-Pointe-des-Érables – a residential area north of Maple Grove
Maple Grove – a former municipality that makes up the northeast boundary of Beauharnois
Melocheville – a former municipality that makes up the western boundary of Beauharnois, located on the west shore of the Beauharnois Canal
Parc-Tisseur – a residential area in southern Beauharnois
Rivière-Nord – a hamlet in southern Beauharnois
Saint-Paul – a residential area located on Route 205

Lakes & Rivers
The following waterways pass through or are situated within the municipality's boundaries:
Rivière Saint-Louis – runs south to north through the city centre, down Chute de la Rivière Saint Louis emptying into the Saint Lawrence River.

Demographics 

Economy
In 2012, OVH started construction of its first Canadian data centre in Beauharnois, one of the largest in the world.

See also
 List of cities in Quebec
 Beauharnois Canal

References

External links

 Beauharnois official website

Cities and towns in Quebec
Incorporated places in Beauharnois-Salaberry Regional County Municipality
Quebec populated places on the Saint Lawrence River
Greater Montreal